Tebet is a district of South Jakarta, one of the administrative cities which form the Capital Region of Jakarta, Indonesia. The boundaries of Tebet are Jend. Gatot Subroto-Letjen Haryono MT. tollway to the south, Ciliwung River to the east, Jalan Casablanca - Ciliwung River to the north, and Cideng River to the west. This district is home to SMA Negeri 8 Jakarta

Tebet is prone to flooding, especially the area around the Ciliwung River.

History
Before urban development, the area that is now Tebet were marsh lands dotted with fish ponds and criss-crossing canals. The river Ciliwung was present in the east side of the district. The name Tebet itself was derived from tebat, Indonesian for "fish pond". Up until the early 1960s many fish ponds could still be found in Tebet.

In preparation for GANEFO and the 1962 Asian Games, the population residing in Senayan had to be relocated because of the compulsory land acquisition to build the Gelora Bung Karno sporting complex. Hence the planning of Tebet was started very early in the 1960s to house the displaced people of Senayan. The administrative villages of Tebet Timur (Jakarta 12820) and Tebet Barat (Jakarta 12810) were the first area in Tebet District to be developed.

Planning of Tebet Timur and Tebet area follows a more or less garden city principle similar with older Kebayoran residential district in southern Jakarta: hierarchical roads, parks, supporting facilities such as schools and clinics, and good water catchment area. Some area in the Tebet residential area were designed as recreation park and water catchment area. One of this area was the park that is now known as Tebet Eco Park. Other parks, e.g. Rawa Bilal, has already been settled with housing that is now Jalan Tebet Mas.

By the early 1970s, the Tebet residential area had already made considerable progress. During the period, some streets were named to commemorate the era of Sukarno e.g. Ganefo Street, Nefo Street (after the GANEFO), Usdek Street, Berdikari Street, and Trikora Street.

Tebet Barat and Tebet Timur Administrative Villages present a well-planned urban design example which contrast the relatively unplanned kampung-like area of Kebon Baru (and Gudang Peluru, Jakarta 12830) to the east of Tebet Timur Administrative Village and Menteng Dalam (Jakarta 12870) to the west of Tebet Barat Administrative Village. Kebon Baru and Menteng Dalam Administrative VIllage grew in the 1970s with no proper planning and as a result the area was prone to flooding and filled with relatively underdeveloped slums.

Kelurahan (Administrative villages)

Tebet District is divided into seven kelurahan or administrative villages: 
Tebet Barat - area code 12810
Tebet Timur - area code 12820
Kebon Baru - area code 12830
Bukit Duri - area code 12840
Manggarai - area code 12850
Manggarai Selatan - area code 12860
Menteng Dalam - area code 12870

List of important places

Menteng Pulo Cemetery
Cawang Railway Station (Tebet Timur)
Manggarai Railway Station, Railway Workshops and Depot
Sahid University 
Kota Kasablanka
Tebet Eco Park
Tebet Railway Station
SMPN 115 Jakarta
SMAN 8 Jakarta
SMPN 73 Jakarta
SMAN 26 Jakarta

Notable residents
 Barack Obama, 44th President of the United States, lived there from 1967 to 1971

References

Cited works

Districts of Jakarta
South Jakarta